Dorothy Sims may refer to:

 Dorothy Clay Sims (born 1957), American lawyer
 Dorothy Rice Sims (1889–1960), American sportswoman, artist and journalist